Touba Airport  is an airport serving Touba, Côte d'Ivoire.

See also
Transport in Côte d'Ivoire

References

 Great Circle Mapper - Touba
 Google Earth

Airports in Ivory Coast
Buildings and structures in Woroba District
Bafing Region